Victor Hall (1884 – 1966) was an English footballer who played for Stoke.

Career
Hall was born in Ashton-under-Lyne and played amateur football with Macclesfield Town before joining Stoke in 1910. He played in one first team match which came in a 1–0 win over Aberdare during the 1910–11 season before returning to amateur football with Macclesfield Town.

Career statistics

References

English footballers
Stoke City F.C. players
1880s births
1966 deaths
Macclesfield Town F.C. players
Footballers from Ashton-under-Lyne
Date of birth missing
Date of death missing
Place of death missing
Association football midfielders